Live at the 100 Club may refer to:

Live at the 100 Club (EP), an EP by The Automatic
Live at the 100 Club (The Damned album)
Live at the 100 Club (The Jam album)
Live at the 100 Club, The Pretty Things album 2014